Yodohara Ohtutumi Dam is an earthfill dam located in Shimane Prefecture in Japan. The dam is used for irrigation. The catchment area of the dam is 0.8 km2. The dam impounds about   ha of land when full and can store 75 thousand cubic meters of water. The construction of the dam was completed in 1998.

References

Dams in Shimane Prefecture
1998 establishments in Japan